Crioprosopus is a genus of long-horned beetles in the family Cerambycidae. There are about 13 described species in Crioprosopus.

The genus Callona was determined to be a synonym of Crioprosopus in 2015, and the species C. championi, C. iridescens, C. thoracicus, C. rimosus, C. thoracicus, and C. tricolor were moved from Callona to Crioprosopus.

Species
These species belong to the genus Crioprosopus:

 Crioprosopus amoenus Jordan, 1895
 Crioprosopus championi Bates, 1885
 Crioprosopus chiriquiensis Eya, 2015
 Crioprosopus gaumeri Bates, 1892
 Crioprosopus hondurensis Eya, 2015
 Crioprosopus iridescens White, 1853
 Crioprosopus nieti Chevrolat, 1857
 Crioprosopus rimosus (Buquet, 1840) (beautiful mesquite borer)
 Crioprosopus saundersii White, 1853
 Crioprosopus servillei Audinet-Serville, 1834
 Crioprosopus thoracicus (White, 1853)
 Crioprosopus tricolor (Waterhouse, 1840)
 Crioprosopus wappesi Eya, 2015

References

Further reading

 
 

Trachyderini
Cerambycidae genera